Erik Parker (born 1968) is a New York-based artist, is known for cartoonish compositions that riff on the traditional genres of portraiture and still-life. His paintings draw inspiration from American subculture—psychedelia, underground comic books, music genres as well as historic modern painters.

Parker studied at the University of Texas, Austin with Peter Saul before receiving an MFA from Purchase College of the State University of New York. Solo exhibitions include Cornerhouse Gallery in Manchester, England; De Appel in Amsterdam; the Modern Art Museum of Fort Worth; Colette in Paris; Honor Fraser in Los Angeles; and Galleri Faurschou in Copenhagen, Denmark.

Life and work

Erik Parker was born in Stuttgart, Germany but later moved to San Antonio, Texas. Parker attended the University of Texas at Austin and studied with teachers including Peter Saul. He later received an MFA from Purchase College in New York.

Erik Parker is known for his precisely brightly colored, layered and highly saturated canvases. Parker's work depicts unique, fantastical scenes of biomorphic subjects and landscapes.  Parker methodically paints each composition creating an intense visual experience. His work maintains a premeditated sense of order while at the same time his composition is composed of bold and fragmented forms. Parker employs many styles in his work, from graffiti to psychedelic album covers and cartoons. Drawing from elements of American subculture, Parker creates color infused paintings that illustrate his take on the pressing issues of our time.

Solo exhibitions

Awards 
 Rema Hort-Mann Foundation Grant (1999)
 Purchase College 25th Anniversary Scholarship (SUNY Purchase College) (1997)
 Rose Scholarship (Visual Arts Department, SUNY Purchase College) (1997)
 Durhurst Family Scholarship (Visual Arts Department, SUNY Purchase College) (1997)
 Excellence in Painting (Department of Art &Art History, University of Texas at Austin) (1995)
 Merit Scholarship in Painting and Drawing (University of Texas at Austin)(1994)
 Denbela-Ortiz Galeria Outstanding Scholarship in Visual Art (San Antonio College) (1992)

Books 
Erik Parker Personae, book published by Honor Fraser Inc. Los Angeles, California 2008. , with text by Max Henry, designed by Brian Roettinger.

Erik Parker: Colorful Resistance, book published by Rizzoli 2012. , with text by Monica Ramirez-Montagut (Author), Peter Saul (Foreword)

References

External links
 Museum of Modern Art (MoMa) Collection: Erik Parker
 Interview/Studio Visit with Erik Parker
 Photo Tour of Erik Parker's Brooklyn Studio

1968 births
Living people
American contemporary painters
German emigrants to the United States
University of Texas at Austin alumni
21st-century American painters
20th-century American painters
Artists from Stuttgart